The Souvenir Henri Desgrange is an award and cash prize given in the yearly running of the Tour de France, one of cycling's Grand Tour races. It is won by the rider that crosses a particular point in the race, mostly the summits of the highest and iconic climbs in the Alps and Pyrenees. It is named in honour of the creator and first race director of the Tour, French sports journalist Henri Desgrange, who was passionate about taking the Tour de France as high up in the mountains as possible using the most difficult routes.

History
Following the death of Desgrange in August 1940, an award was given in his honour for the first time in the 1947 Tour, the first Tour since 1939, having been cancelled during World War II. On stage 11, Raymond Impanis was the first of the field to pass a point by Desgrange's final residence, the "Villa Mia" in Beauvallon, Grimaud, on the French Riviera. In the first stage of the 1948 Tour, the prize was earned by Roger Lambrecht in the opening few kilometres at the summit of the Côte de Picardie climb in Versailles, Paris. Beauvallon again hosted the award the following year, before the 1950 and 1951 Tours saw the award marker point moved into the mountains atop the -high Col du Lautaret, the pass that directly precedes the Galibier climb from the south. In 1949, a monument to Desgrange was built  from the southern entrance of the summit tunnel atop the Col du Galibier in the Alps, his favourite and one of the Tour's most iconic climbs. A wreath is laid at the monument when the Tour passes. Beginning in 1952, the marking point for the prize took place by the monument for the subsequent times the Tour visited the Galibier. Since the 1965 Tour, the Galibier has always been used when it was passed.

The tunnel at the summit of the Galibier was closed for safety reasons in 1976 – eventually re-opening in 2002. This has been the award's marking point on the Galibier ever since it was first traversed in the 1979 Tour, when Lucien Van Impe claimed the award. The tunnel was passed through on stage 19 of the 2011 Tour, but in that edition the Galibier was climbed twice in celebration the 100th anniversary of its appearance in the Tour. The finish of the previous stage was atop the full Galibier climb, where Andy Schleck claimed memorable stage win as well as the award after his  solo breakaway. This was first ever Galibier summit stage finish and the highest ever Tour stage finish in history to that point. Further notable stages featuring the award on the Galibier were in the 1952 and 1998 Tours, when Italians Fausto Coppi and Marco Pantani, respectively, took the award and then went on to win the stage, which proved decisive to both their overall general classification victories.

Non-summit marking points have been sparsely used for the award. Beauvallon was a host for a total of six times, with a final appearance in the 1964 Tour. The village of Cysoing in the far north hosted on the 1956 Tour, marking 200,000 kilometres travelled in Tour de France history. Only twice have non-summit marking points happened since 1964. Stage 11 of the 1978 race saw the award given to Christian Seznec at the legendary village of Sainte-Marie de Campan in the valley between the Col du Tourmalet and Col d'Aspin in the Pyrenees, made famous when in the 1913 Tour, per the rules, Eugène Christophe was forced walk  down the Tourmalet carrying his bicycle broken before repairing it at a forge in Campan. The last time a non-summit point took place during the Grand Départ (opening stages) of the 1981 Tour, hosted by Nice, with the award at first planned to take place in the final kilometres of stage 1a beside the Carrefour supermarket on the Promenade des Anglais. This break from tradition was seen by the media as disrespectful to the race and the legacy of Desgrange. For unknown reasons the marking point banner was stolen the night before. The replacement banner was strung up in the Landes forest  before the end of stage 7 in Bordeaux, which was won unexpectedly by Theo de Rooij as a result of him being at the front of the leading breakaway group.

From the 1965 Tour onwards, if the Galibier was not passed then the award was instead given atop a climb of similarly equal height, most commonly the Tourmalet, and beginning with the 1997 Tour, the highest climb of a Tour was mostly used when the Galibier was not included. Since the 2013 Tour, the highest climb has always been used. On two occasions the Galibier climb been cancelled because of bad weather and the award locations were moved; snow in 1996 saw it replaced by the -high Pyreenan Col d'Aubisque, and landslides in 2015 moved the award to -high Alpine Col d'Allos.

The amount of cash given as a prize for the award was higher in the early Tours. Cash prizes have also been given to the second and third placed riders. Since 2003, the winner has received a €5000 prize. Only in the 1963 Tour has the award not been given, although at the conclusion of that race there was a special "Desgrange prize" given to the general classification winner Jacques Anquetil who was adjudged to have had the best "head and legs" throughout the Tour. The Souvenir Jacques Goddet, honouring the second Tour director Jacques Goddet, is a similar award in the race given since the 2001 Tour mostly atop the Tourmalet.

Locations and winners

Multiple winners

The following riders have won the Souvenir Henri Desgrange on 2 or more occasions.

Winners by nationality

Riders from sixteen different countries have won the Souvenir Henri Desgrange.

See also

 Cima Coppi – a similar award given in Italy's Grand Tour, the Giro d'Italia.

Notes

References

Bibliography

External links

Tour de France classifications and awards